The Albert Lea Tribune is an American, English language newspaper published in Albert Lea, Minnesota. It was founded in 1897.  It is published Tuesday thru Saturday and has  a circulation of 3,366.  It was owned by Boone Newspapers in 2019.

History
The Albert Lea Tribune was founded in 1897.  It has had several names:
The Albert Lea Evening Tribune (1981-current)
The Evening Tribune (1905-1981)
The Albert Lea Evening Tribune (1898-1905)

References

Newspapers published in Minnesota
1897 establishments in Minnesota
Publications established in 1897
Freeborn County, Minnesota